The  is a German-Japanese hotel prominent in Düsseldorf since 1978. Located in the heart of Little Tokyo in Stadtmitte, the hotel opened in 1978 in conjunction with the German-Japanese Center. It has undergone one major expansion in 2009 and renovated all rooms in the major wing. Also, a renovation of the spa and conference facilities has been done in 2013. In 2018 a complete renovation of 220 guest rooms, lobby, F&B, entrance and much more has been done.

The hotel is now renamed as the Clayton Hotel Düsseldorf.

Location
The Hotel Nikko Düsseldorf is the biggest hotel located in the center of Düsseldorf with 393 rooms. The hotel has three restaurants on the premises. In February 2022 the Irish Dalata Hotel Group joins as operating company and further develops the brand. Today, the hotel is one of the Top 5 Hotels in Düsseldorf for business and leisure purposes and is very popular with Japanese travellers. Guests can experience authentic Japanese food in the Lobby Restaurant and can enjoy the unique high class Benkay Teppanyaki Restaurant as a live cooking show. On the top level is the famous Sky Spa with a beautiful view of the city skyline.

The Hotel Nikko Düsseldorf is since the opening in 1978 licensed by Okura Nikko Hotel Management (formerly JAL Hotels International Group).

See also
 Japanese community of Düsseldorf

References

External links
 Hotel Nikko Düsseldorf 

Hotel Nikko Dusseldorf
Hotel Nikko Dusseldorf
Hotels established in 1978
Hotel buildings completed in 1978
Hotel Nikko Dusseldorf